Donald Raymond Bollweg (February 12, 1921 – May 26, 1996) was an American first baseman in Major League Baseball who played for three teams from 1950 to 1955.

He was born in Wheaton, Illinois, and after signing with the St. Louis Cardinals in 1942, served in the United States Army during World War II. He played 70 games for the 1953 Yankees team which captured their fifth consecutive World Series title. In the 1953 Series against the Brooklyn Dodgers, he was used as a pinch hitter in Games 3 and 4, striking out both times, and as a defensive replacement for Johnny Mize in the ninth inning of Game 6 as the Yankees took the title. In December 1953 he was traded to the Philadelphia Athletics in an 11-player deal, and he shared playing time at first base in 1954 with Lou Limmer.

He continued playing in the minor leagues in 1955 and 1956. Bollweg died in Wheaton at age 75.

External links

1921 births
1996 deaths
Major League Baseball first basemen
St. Louis Cardinals players
New York Yankees players
Philadelphia Athletics players
Kansas City Athletics players
Indianapolis Indians players
Baseball players from Illinois
United States Army soldiers
United States Army personnel of World War II
Sportspeople from Wheaton, Illinois
American Association (1902–1997) MVP Award winners